Hugo Paul Thieme (born Fort Wayne, Indiana, February 2, 1870; died Ann Arbor, Michigan, June 2, 1940) was an American literary critic, bibliographer, and university professor.

Works
La littérature française du dix-neuvième siècle. Bibliographie des principaux prosateurs, poètes, auteurs dramatiques et critiques, Paris 1897 (90 pages)
Guide bibliographique de la littérature française de 1800 à 1906. Prosateurs, poètes, auteurs dramatiques et critiques, Paris 1907, Grenoble 2010 (510 pages)
Women of modern France, Philadelphia 1907, Project Gutenberg 2005 (Woman in all ages and in all countries)
(with John Robert Effinger) A French grammar, New York 1908, 1912
Essai sur l'histoire du vers français, Paris  1916, New York 1971
La civilisation française jugée par un Américain, Paris 1924 
Essais sur la civilisation française, Paris 1933
Bibliographie de la littérature française de 1800 à 1930, 3 volumes, Paris 1933, 2 volumes, Geneva 1971, 1983 (1. A-K, 2. L-Z, 3. La civilisation [Ouvrages et articles à consulter sur l’histoire de la langue, de la littérature et de la civilisation française]; XXVII-1061, XXV-1041, 216 pages)

External links  

 

Romance philologists
University of Michigan faculty
Chevaliers of the Légion d'honneur
American male writers
1870 births
1940 deaths
People from Fort Wayne, Indiana